Connor Malley (born 20 March 2000) is an English professional footballer who currently plays for League of Ireland Premier Division side Dundalk.

Career

Middlesbrough 
Born in Hebburn, Malley started his career in the youth academy of Sunderland before joining Middlesbrough. He signed his first professional contract with the club in May 2019, signing a three-year contract lasting until the summer of 2022.

Ayr loan 
He joined Scottish Championship side Ayr United on loan to the end of the season on 31 January 2020. He made his debut for the club on 25 February 2020, where he scored in a 2–1 win over Greenock Morton. He went on to make 5 appearances for Ayr, scoring once.

Carlisle United loan 
On 2 October 2020, Malley joined League Two side Carlisle United on loan until January 2021. He returned to Middlesbrough at the end of his loan in January 2021, having made 5 appearances in all competitions. 

He made his debut for Middlesbrough on 21 April 2021 as a first-half substitute for the injured Grant Hall in a 2–1 away victory over Rotherham United, with Malley's performance described as "outstanding". He made two further appearances for Middlesbrough that season as they finished 10th in the Championship.

Gateshead loan 
On 5 March 2022, Malley joined National League North side Gateshead on loan for the remainder of the 2021–22 season.

Rochdale 
On 15 August 2022, Malley signed for League Two club Rochdale on a free transfer after being released by Middlesbrough earlier in the summer. Malley departed the club upon the expiration of his short-term contract in January 2023.

Career statistics

References

External links
 
 

2000 births
Living people
English footballers
Footballers from Newcastle upon Tyne
Association football midfielders
Middlesbrough F.C. players
Ayr United F.C. players
Carlisle United F.C. players
Gateshead F.C. players
Rochdale A.F.C. players
Scottish Professional Football League players
English Football League players
National League (English football) players